Kevin Shields is an Irish musician, singer-songwriter, composer and producer who has released three studio albums with My Bloody Valentine and collaborated with 25 different artists. He began performing in the late 1970s and formed the Dublin-based punk rock band The Complex with drummer Colm Ó Cíosóig and guitarist Liam Ó Maonlaí. Following Ó Maonlaí's departure, Shields and Ó Cíosóig recruited vocalist David Conway and formed a new band, My Bloody Valentine, in 1983.

After My Bloody Valentine's debut mini album, This is Your Bloody Valentine (1985), failed to receive much attention, the band relocated to London, United Kingdom. The band released several extended plays, one further mini album and experienced a line-up change, recruiting vocalist and guitarist Bilinda Butcher and bassist Debbie Googe, before the release of their two studio albums, Isn't Anything (1988) and Loveless (1991)—both of which pioneered an alternative rock subgenre known as shoegazing. During this time, Shields created a guitar technique known as "glide guitar", which includes extensive use of the tremolo arm while strumming and features reverse reverb sourced from his Yamaha SPX90 processing unit.

Following My Bloody Valentine's disbandment in 1997, Shields collaborated with a number of artists, including Yo La Tengo, Dinosaur Jr., The Go! Team, The Pastels, Le Volume Courbe and Spacemen 3. He contributed guitar and also co-producing to two Primal Scream albums, XTRMNTR (2000) and Evil Heat (2002), and became a touring member of the band between 1996 and 2006. During this time, Shields composed music for the Canadian contemporary dance group La La La Human Steps and recorded four songs for Sofia Coppola's 2003 film Lost in Translation—which earned him nominations for a British Academy of Film and Television Arts (BAFTA) award for Best Film Music, an Irish Film and Television Academy (IFTA) award for Best Music in a Film, and an Online Film Critics Society award for Best Original Score. In 2008, Shields released The Coral Sea, a collaborative live album with Patti Smith, on which he provided musical accompaniment to Smith's reading of her book of the same name.

My Bloody Valentine reunited in 2007, commenced on a worldwide tour and began completing their third studio album, m b v, which they had begun in the late 1990s. It was released in February 2013 on mbv Records and upon its release, the album received "universal acclaim" from critics, according to Metacritic. Shields has since announced intentions to release a My Bloody Valentine EP "of all-new material", which will be followed by a fourth studio album.

Albums

With My Bloody Valentine

With Patti Smith

Singles

Contributions

Collaborations

See also
My Bloody Valentine discography

References

Bibliography

External links

Shields, Kevin
Shields, Kevin
My Bloody Valentine (band)